Hadra is a genus of air-breathing land snails in the family Camaenidae.

Species
Species within the genus Hadra include:
Hadra barneyi (Cox, 1873)
Hadra bartschi (W. B. Marshall, 1927)
Hadra bellendenkerensis
Hadra beddomae
Hadra bipartita  (Férussac, 1823)
 Hadra brunodavidi Stanisic, 2010
Hadra funiculata (Reeve, 1854)
Hadra semicastanea (Pfeiffer, 1849)
Hadra webbi (Pilsbry, 1900)
Species brought into synonymy
 Hadra adcockiana Bednall, 1894 : synonym of Granulomelon adcockianum (Bednall, 1894) (original combination)
 Hadra arcigerens Tate, 1894 : synonym of Granulomelon adcockianum (Bednall, 1894)
 Hadra blighi Iredale, 1937 : synonym of Hadra semicastanea (Pfeiffer, 1849) (junior synonym)
 Hadra blomfieldi (Cox, 1864) : synonym of Sphaerospira blomfieldi (Cox, 1864) (superseded combination)
 Hadra clydonigera Tate, 1894 : synonym of Granulomelon adcockianum (Bednall, 1894) (junior synonym)
 Hadra corneovirens (Pfeiffer, 1851) : synonym of Sauroconcha corneovirens (L. Pfeiffer, 1851) (superseded combination)
 Hadra euzyga Tate, 1894 : synonym of Catellotrachia euzyga (Tate, 1894) (original combination)
 Hadra grandituberculata Tate, 1894 : synonym of Granulomelon grandituberculatum (Tate, 1894) (original combination)
 Hadra granulifera Möllendorff, 1888 : synonym of Euhadra granulifera (Möllendorff, 1888) (original combination)
 Hadra leonhardti Möllendorff, 1888 : synonym of Camaena leonhardti (Möllendorff, 1888) (original combination)
 Hadra mortenseni Iredale, 1929 : synonym of Sphaerospira mortenseni (Iredale, 1929)
 Hadra nux Möllendorff, 1888 : synonym of Satsuma nux (Möllendorff, 1888) (original combination)
 Hadra oligopleura Tate, 1894 : synonym of Basedowena oligopleura (Tate, 1894) (original combination)
 Hadra papillosa Tate, 1894 : synonym of Catellotrachia setigera (Tate, 1894) (junior synonym)
 Hadra philippinensis C. Semper, 1873 : synonym of Camaena philippinensis (C. Semper, 1873) (superseded combination)
 Hadra rockhamptonensis (Cox, 1873) : synonym of Sphaerospira rockhamptonensis (Cox, 1873) (superseded combination)
 Hadra schmackeri Möllendorff, 1888 : synonym of Euhadra schmackeri (Möllendorff, 1888) (original combination)
 Hadra setigera Tate, 1894 : synonym of Catellotrachia setigera (Tate, 1894) (original combination)
 Hadra squamulosa Tate, 1894 : synonym of Granulomelon squamulosum (Tate, 1894) (original combination)
 Hadra subgibbera Möllendorff, 1885 : synonym of Camaena subgibbera (Möllendorff, 1885) (original combination)
 Hadra sublevata Tate, 1894 : synonym of Dirutrachia sublevata (Tate, 1894) (original combination)
 Hadra wattii Tate, 1894 : synonym of Vidumelon wattii (Tate, 1894) (original combination)
 Hadra wilpenensis Tate, 1894 : synonym of Sinumelon wilpenense (Tate, 1894) (original combination)
Hadra wilsoniSolem, 1979 : synonym of Youwanjela wilsoni (Solem, 1979) (original combination)
 Hadra winneckeana Tate, 1894 : synonym of Catellotrachia winneckeana (Tate, 1894) (original combination)

References

External links
 OBIS, Indo-Pacific Molluscan database
 Iredale, T. (1933). Systematic notes on Australian land shells. Records of the Australian Museum. 19(1): 37-59.

 
Camaenidae